Soul Flowers is an album by jazz organist Johnny "Hammond" Smith recorded for the Prestige label in 1967.

Reception

The Allmusic site awarded the album 3 stars stating "When a soul-jazz artist decides to devote the bulk of his album to pop standards and themes from the movies, stage, and TV, he better make damn sure that he interprets them in an inventive fashion. Fortunately, that's what Smith manages to do on this 1967 session".

Track listing
All compositions by Johnny "Hammond" Smith except where noted
 "N.Y.P.D." (Charles Gross) - 3:30   
 "Dirty Apple" - 5:00   
 "Days of Wine and Roses" (Henry Mancini, Johnny Mercer) - 3:20   
 "Ode to Billie Joe" (Bobbie Gentry) - 3:15   
 "You'll Never Walk Alone" (Oscar Hammerstein II, Richard Rodgers) - 3:10   
 "Alfie" (Burt Bacharach, Hal David) - 3:05   
 "Tara's Theme" (Max Steiner) - 3:35   
 "Here's That Rainy Day" (Johnny Burke, Jimmy Van Heusen) - 4:45   
 "I Got a Woman" (Ray Charles, Renald Richard) - 5:20

Personnel
Johnny "Hammond" Smith - organ
Earl Edwards, Houston Person - tenor saxophone
Wally Richardson - guitar
Jimmy Lewis - electric bass
John Harris - drums
Richie "Pablo" Landrum - congas

Production
 Cal Lampley - producer
 Rudy Van Gelder - engineer

References

Johnny "Hammond" Smith albums
1968 albums
Prestige Records albums
Albums produced by Cal Lampley
Albums recorded at Van Gelder Studio